Look Afraid is an Ohio-based rock band formed in 2007. They won the international competition called Famecast in December 2007.

History
Look Afraid was formed by Alex Nauth and Mat Franklin, previously of Sofapunch (a ska band with mild Ohio exposure). Alex "Lex Vegas" Mosie was called in to play drums, as he had filled in with Franklin and Nauth for previous projects and was a close personal friend of the two.  Mike Ulanski who was playing in a local gutter punk band called The Proles became the original lead guitarist. When auditioning bass players, Ulanski suggested that Sam Duff, who was playing bass in The Proles, audition and he soon became a permanent member of Look Afraid. When Mike's time restraints with the Proles became too much for the band, the five of them agreed that Mike would step down and Cole Walsh-Davis, formerly of the Culling Song, was asked to join the group.

The now finalized lineup entered the studio with producer Brian Whitten to record their debut EP, Zombie Dance Party, in June 2007. The EP, along with nonstop playing, garnered Look Afraid a number of dedicated fans, who the band took to calling "Fraidy Cats", who would help the band tremendously as they won an international talent competition hosted by Famecast in December 2007. The band took home $10,000 and much press attention after beating hundreds of bands from around the world. Aaron Burgess of Spin Magazine was at their performance in Austin, Texas and called them "A Badass Rock Band"  (can be seen in print beneath the live performance video). Look Afraid also collaborated with legendary poster artist Jeff Gaither, who has designed images for the Misfits, Van Halen and Guns N' Roses, on two poster designs for a series of Halloween shows, one of which was featured on the cover of Miami University's Amusement Magazine.

The band  then produced the Rock N' Roll Glory Hole EP. A much darker and more rock-oriented disc than their first. The band recorded their third Whitten-produced EP, entitled Drive, which included the track "Hell City," the official theme song of the Hell City tattoo convention, which was held in Columbus, Ohio on May 29–31, 2009. 

Look Afraid recorded their fourth EP, a split with Cincinnati's Banderas called Hired Guns, with producer Mitch Wyatt in January 2009. The EP features two new original tracks as well as a cover of Banderas' "Ground Out Heel". The band contributed the song "Bring in the Tide" to the soundtrack of An Education in Rebellion, an upcoming biography of Mötley Crüe bassist Nikki Sixx, due out in 2010.

Members
Alex Nauth: vocals
Mat Franklin: guitar
Cole Walsh-Davis: guitar
Sam Duff: bass
Alex "Lex Vegas" Mosie: drums

Discography
EPs
Zombie Dance Party (2007)
Rock N' Roll Glory Hole (2008)
Drive (2008)
Anthology (2010)
Split EP
Hired Guns (with Banderas) (2009)

References

Rock music groups from Ohio
Musical groups established in 2007